Coryell is a surname. Notable people with the name include:

 Charles D. Coryell (1912–1971), American chemist
 Don Coryell (1924–2010), American football coach
 Hubert V. Coryell (1889–1979), American author
 John R. Coryell (1851–1924), American dime novel author
 Julian Coryell (born 1973), American singer, songwriter, guitarist, and producer
 Larry Coryell (1943–2017), American jazz fusion guitarist
 Murali Coryell (born 1969), American blues guitarist and singer